The 3rd Empire Awards ceremony, presented by the British film magazine Empire, honored the best films of 1997 and took place in 1998. During the ceremony, Empire presented Empire Awards in nine categories as well as one honorary award. The awards were sponsored by Stella Artois for the first time.

All of the winners this year won one award each. The Full Monty won the award for Best British Film, while Men in Black won the award for Best Film. Other winners included A Life Less Ordinary, Hamlet, Jerry Maguire, L.A. Confidential, Nil by Mouth, The Crucible and The English Patient. Dennis Hopper received the Lifetime Achievement Award.

Winners and nominees
Winners are listed first and highlighted in boldface.

References

External links
 

Empire Award ceremonies
1997 film awards
1998 in British cinema
1998 in London